The 1986 National Challenge Cup was the 72nd edition of the USSF's annual open soccer championship. Teams from the American Soccer League declined to participate.  Kutis SC of St. Louis defeated San Pedro Yugoslavs 1–0 in the final game.

References

External links
 1986 National Challenge Cup – TheCup.us

Cup
U.S. Open Cup